Xerocrassa edmundi is a species of air-breathing land snail, a pulmonate gastropod mollusk in the family Geomitridae.

Distribution

This species is endemic to Spain, where it occurs in the nature reserve of the Serra d'Espadà in the Castellón province of the Valencian autonomous community.

References

 Bank, R. A.; Neubert, E. (2017). Checklist of the land and freshwater Gastropoda of Europe. Last update: July 16th, 2017

External links

edmundi
Endemic fauna of Spain
Molluscs of Europe
Gastropods described in 2006